The 2014–15 season is the Futbol Club Barcelona "B" 45th in existence and the club's 22nd season in Segunda División and 5th consecutive season in the second top flight of Spanish football.

Season Overview
During the summer transfer window, many players like Rodri, Dani Nieto, Javier Espinosa, Edu Bedia departed, while players such as Alen Halilović, Diawandou Diagne, Maxi Rolón and Fabrice Ondoa all joined the club. Despite finishing in third place in 2013–14, the team suffered relegation at the end of the season.

Players

Squad information

Transfers in

|}

Total expending:   €2.23 million

Transfers out

Total income:  €780,000

Total expenditure:   €1.45 million

References

FC Barcelona Atlètic seasons
FC Barcelona B
Barcelona B
Barcelona B